Baynuj (also Romanized as Bāynūj; also known as Bainu, Bāynū, and Beynū) is a village in Dar Agah Rural District, in the Central District of Hajjiabad County, Hormozgan Province, Iran. At the 2006 census, its population was 533, in 127 families.

References 

Populated places in Hajjiabad County